Eemu  is a village of South Kashmir's Kulgam district of Jammu and Kashmir.

References

Villages in Kulgam district